Dunthorne is a small lunar impact crater that is located to the northwest of the small lunar mare called Palus Epidemiarum, in the southwest part of the Moon's near side. It was named after British astronomer Richard Dunthorne. It lies to the southwest of the crater Campanus, east of Vitello. Due south is Ramsden.

This crater is roughly circular and bowl-shaped, with an interior that has a higher albedo than the surrounding terrain. It lies in a region that has a number of rille systems, with the Rimae Hippalus to the northwest, and the Rimae Ramsden to the south and east.

Satellite craters
By convention these features are identified on lunar maps by placing the letter on the side of the crater midpoint that is closest to Dunthorne.

References

External links
 

Impact craters on the Moon